The 1976 New York Mets season was the 15th regular season for the Mets, who played home games at Shea Stadium. Led by manager Joe Frazier, the team had an 86–76 record and finished in third place in the National League East.

Offseason 
On December 6, Mrs. Lorinda de Roulet, daughter of the late Joan Payson, was named president of the Mets. The critical decisions, however, were still made by board chairman M. Donald Grant and General Manager Joe McDonald.

Notable transactions 
 December 3, 1975: Kelvin Chapman was signed as an amateur free agent by the Mets.
 December 12, 1975: Rusty Staub and Bill Laxton were traded by the Mets to the Detroit Tigers for Mickey Lolich and Billy Baldwin.
 January 7, 1976: 1976 Major League Baseball draft
Greg Harris was drafted by the Mets in the 7th round, but did not sign.
Kim Seaman was drafted by the Mets in the 4th round of the Secondary Phase.
 March 5, 1976: Mario Ramírez was signed as an amateur free agent by the Mets.
 March 30, 1976: Jesús Alou was released by the Mets.

Regular season

Season Summary
On September 16, before a small crowd of 5,472 at Shea Stadium, Jerry Koosman overcame a home run by future Mets player Keith Hernandez to pitch a complete game and win his 20th game of the season for the first time in his career in a 4–1 victory over the St. Louis Cardinals. He became the second pitcher in NY Mets history to win 20 games.

Season standings

Record vs. opponents

Notable transactions 
 June 8, 1976: Dave Von Ohlen was drafted by the Mets in the 17th round of the 1976 Major League Baseball draft.
 July 21, 1976: Del Unser and Wayne Garrett were traded by the Mets to the Montreal Expos for Jim Dwyer and Pepe Mangual.
 September 17, 1976: Greg Harris was signed as an amateur free agent by the Mets.

Roster

Player stats

Batting

Starters by position 
Note: Pos = Position; G = Games played; AB = At bats; H = Hits; Avg. = Batting average; HR = Home runs; RBI = Runs batted in

Other batters 
Note: G = Games played; AB = At bats; H = Hits; Avg. = Batting average; HR = Home runs; RBI = Runs batted in

Pitching

Starting pitchers 
Note: G = Games pitched; IP = Innings pitched; W = Wins; L = Losses; ERA = Earned run average; SO = Strikeouts

Other pitchers 
Note: G = Games pitched; IP = Innings pitched; W = Wins; L = Losses; ERA = Earned run average; SO = Strikeouts

Relief pitchers 
Note: G = Games pitched; W = Wins; L = Losses; SV = Saves; ERA = Earned run average; SO = Strikeouts

Farm system

Notes

References

External links 
1976 New York Mets at Baseball Reference
1976 New York Mets at Baseball Almanac

New York Mets seasons
New York Mets season
New York
1970s in Queens